Brachycephalus rotenbergae is a species of toadlet in the family Brachycephalidae. It was first described in 2021. The species is found in the forests of the Brazilian state of São Paulo in the south Mantiqueira mountain range and the semidecidual forests.

Description 
Brachycephalus rotenbergae males are around 1.35 to 1.6 cm long with females being 1.6-1.8 cm long. Brachycephalus rotenbergae colors may work as a camouflage in their microhabitat, since there are great amounts of tiny yellow and orange leaves, mushrooms and seeds on the ground, especially during the active season.

Range
The species is native to Brazil in the state of São Paulo. It is found in the Mantiqueira mountain range and the semidecidual forests located in the municipalities of Mogi das Cruzes, Campinas, and Jundiaí.

References

rotenbergae
Frogs of South America
Amphibians of Brazil
Endemic fauna of Brazil
Amphibians described in 2021